Giamatti is an American surname, a variant of Italian Giammattei. The surname is derived from the given name Gian Matteo, from Italian forms for 'John' and 'Matthew'. Notable people with the surname include:

 A. Bartlett Giamatti (1938–1989), President of Yale University and later Commissioner of Major League Baseball
 Marcus Giamatti (born 1961), American actor, son of Bart and brother of Paul
 Paul Giamatti (born 1967), American actor, son of Bart

References

Italian-language surnames